Madonna M. Soctomah is a Passamaquoddy politician from Maine. Soctomah represented the Passamaquoddy people as a non-voting tribal representative in the Maine House of Representatives. She has been elected by her people to four two-year terms (2000, 2002, 2010, 2012).

Soctomah has been a persistent advocate for a Passamaquoddy-owned casino in Maine. During her first term in the House of Representatives, Soctomah introduced a bill allowing her tribe to operate a casino. In 2012, Soctomah again introduced a bill to create a gaming facility in Washington County.

References

Year of birth missing (living people)
Living people
Women state legislators in Maine
Native American state legislators in Maine
Members of the Maine House of Representatives
Passamaquoddy people
Native American people from Maine
Native American women in politics
21st-century American politicians
21st-century American women politicians
21st-century Native American women
21st-century Native Americans